The 2020 All Africa Men's and Women's Team Badminton Championships was a continental stage tournament of Thomas and Uber Cups, and also to crown the best men's and women's badminton team in Africa. This tournament was held in Cairo, Egypt between 10 and 13 February 2020.

Medalists

Tournament 
The All Africa Men's and Women's Team Badminton Championships officially crowns the best male and female national badminton teams in Africa and at the same time works as the African qualification event towards the 2020 Thomas & Uber Cup finals. 13 teams consisting of 9 men's team and 4 women's team have entered the tournament.

Venue 
Venue of this tournament is Cairo Stadium Hall 2, in Cairo, Egypt.

Men's team

Group stage

Group A

Algeria vs Tunisia

Mauritius vs Uganda

Mauritius vs Tunisia

Algeria vs Uganda

Uganda vs Tunisia

Algeria vs Mauritius

Group B

South Africa vs Cameroon

Egypt vs Cameroon

Egypt vs Morocco

Egypt vs South Africa

Morocco vs Cameroon

South Africa vs Morocco

Knockout stage

Semifinals
Algeria vs South Africa

Mauritius vs Egypt

Final
Algeria vs Mauritius

Women's team

Round robin

Egypt vs Algeria

Mauritius vs South Africa

Egypt vs South Africa

Mauritius vs Algeria

South Africa vs Algeria

Egypt vs Mauritius

References

External links
Tournament draws

Africa Continental Team Badminton Championships
All Africa Men's and Women's Team Badminton Championships
2020 in Egyptian sport
All Africa Men's and Women's Team Badminton Championships